Lameh Dasht (also Romanized as Lam‘eh Dasht; also known as Lumadasht and Lyumedesht) is a village in Khanandabil-e Gharbi Rural District of the Central District of Khalkhal County, Ardabil province, Iran. At the 2006 census, its population was 1,079 in 255 households. The following census in 2011 counted 1,268 people in 347 households. The latest census in 2016 showed a population of 977 people in 310 households; it was the largest village in its rural district.

References 

Khalkhal County

Towns and villages in Khalkhal County

Populated places in Ardabil Province

Populated places in Khalkhal County